The 2022 FA Cup final was an association football match played at Wembley Stadium in London, England, on 14 May 2022. Chelsea and Liverpool were the finalists, the same as in the 2022 EFL Cup Final earlier in the season. This was the first time that the same pair of teams met in both the EFL Cup Final and the FA Cup Final of the same season since Arsenal and Sheffield Wednesday in 1993. Organised by the Football Association (FA), it was the 141st final of the Football Association Challenge Cup (FA Cup) and the showpiece match of English football's primary cup competition. The match also marked 150 years since the first FA Cup Final was played in 1872. The match was televised live in the United Kingdom on free-to-air channels BBC One and ITV (the first time since 1988 that both channels have simultaneously broadcast an FA Cup Final). In the UK, live radio coverage was provided by BBC Radio 5 Live and talkSPORT.

Liverpool won the trophy on penalties after the game remained goalless after extra time; it was the first final to finish goalless since 2005 and the first to go to penalties since Liverpool's previous victory in 2006.  Liverpool manager Jürgen Klopp became the first German-born manager to win the FA Cup. Chelsea set a record by losing a third consecutive final, after defeats to Arsenal and Leicester City in the 2020 and 2021 finals, respectively. 

As current title holders, Liverpool qualified for the UEFA Champions League tournament by their position in the 2021–22 Premier League, the 2022–23 UEFA Europa League position went to the sixth-placed Premier League team, Manchester United.

Route to the final

Chelsea

Being from the Premier League, Chelsea entered the tournament in the third round and had the home advantage when they defeated Chesterfield at Stamford Bridge. They beat Plymouth Argyle in the fourth round at Stamford Bridge. In the fifth round, they beat Luton Town away at Kenilworth Road.

Chelsea were visitors when they defeated in the quarter-final match Middlesbrough at the Riverside Stadium. In the semi-final match, Chelsea was at the neutral location of Wembley Stadium where they defeated Crystal Palace.

Liverpool

Being from the Premier League, Liverpool entered the tournament in the third round to defeat Shrewsbury Town at Anfield. In the fourth round, they beat Cardiff City 3–1, also at Anfield. They beat Norwich City also at home in the fifth round. They beat Nottingham Forest away at the City Ground in the quarter-final, before defeating Manchester City at Wembley Stadium.

Pre-match
This was the sides' second meeting in an FA Cup final, having met in 2012, when Chelsea won 2–1. They also met in four other title-deciding matches; the 2005 and 2022 League Cup finals, the 2006 FA Community Shield, and the 2019 UEFA Super Cup; Chelsea won the 2005 meeting and Liverpool won the other three. The two teams had met earlier in the season, in the 2022 EFL Cup Final, with Liverpool winning on penalties, with both matches between the teams in the 2021–22 Premier League ending in draws, 1–1 at Anfield and 2–2 at Stamford Bridge. This was the first time that the same pair of teams met in both the EFL Cup Final and the FA Cup Final of the same season since Arsenal and Sheffield Wednesday in 1993.

Match

Summary
In the 8th minute of the match Trent Alexander-Arnold passed into the path of Luis Díaz who ran in on goal and shot low from the left which was saved by Édouard Mendy and eventually cleared. In the 23rd minute, Christian Pulisic shot past the left post for Chelsea after a low cross from the right.
Chelsea had another chance in the 27th minute with Alisson getting down to block a shot from the left by Marcos Alonso. In the 47th minute, Alisson again got down to his right to save a shot from Pulisic. A minute later Marcos Alonso hit a free-kick from the right against the back left post. In the 83rd minute Luis Díaz shot from the right of the penalty area which went wide off the outside of the right past. A minute later Andrew Robertson hit a shot against the left post from close range after a cross from the right by James Milner. Luis Díaz curled another shot just past the right post in the 90th minute.

After no goals in extra-time the match went to a penalty shoot-out. César Azpilicueta missed with Chelsea's second penalty with his shot hitting the post. After four successful penalties scored by Liverpool, Sadio Mané had the chance to win the game but his penalty was saved by Mendy down low to his left. Alisson then saved down to his left from Mason Mount which allowed Kostas Tsimikas to win the game for Liverpool when he scored his penalty, hitting it low into the left corner, sending Mendy the wrong way.

Details

Statistics

Notes

References

2021–22 FA Cup
FA Cup Finals
FA Cup Final 2022
FA Cup Final 2022
Events at Wembley Stadium
FA Cup Final
FA Cup Final
Fa Cup Final 2022